Oliver Eronen (28 May 1865 in Joroinen – 2 October 1939) was a Finnish farmer and politician. He was a member of the Parliament of Finland from 1907 to 1919 and again from 1922 to 1924, representing the Social Democratic Party of Finland (SDP). He was imprisoned from 1918 to 1919 for having sided with the Reds during the Finnish Civil War.

References

1865 births
1939 deaths
People from Joroinen
People from Mikkeli Province (Grand Duchy of Finland)
Social Democratic Party of Finland politicians
Members of the Parliament of Finland (1907–08)
Members of the Parliament of Finland (1908–09)
Members of the Parliament of Finland (1909–10)
Members of the Parliament of Finland (1910–11)
Members of the Parliament of Finland (1911–13)
Members of the Parliament of Finland (1913–16)
Members of the Parliament of Finland (1916–17)
Members of the Parliament of Finland (1917–19)
Members of the Parliament of Finland (1922–24)
People of the Finnish Civil War (Red side)
Prisoners and detainees of Finland